The Joy Division Peel sessions are a series of sessions recorded by English post-punk band Joy Division for John Peel's radio show on BBC Radio 1 between January and November 1979.

Releases

The Peel Sessions EP (1986) 

The first EP, The Peel Sessions, was released in 1986 by record label Strange Fruit. It features recordings made for John Peel's show broadcast on 14 February 1979, and was recorded at the BBC Studios in Maida Vale, London, England on 31 January 1979. None of the songs had been released prior to the broadcast. The version of "Transmission" is one of the few recordings available where both Curtis and Sumner play guitar at the same time.

The EP spent thirteen weeks on the UK Indie Chart, peaking at number 4.

Track listing

The Peel Sessions EP (1987) 

The second EP, also titled The Peel Sessions, was released in 1987 by Strange Fruit. It features the recordings made for John Peel's show broadcast on 10 December 1979, and was recorded at the BBC Studios in Maida Vale, London, England on 26 November 1979. None of the songs had been released prior to the broadcast.

The EP spent seventeen weeks on the UK Indie Chart, peaking at number 3.

Track listing

Peel Sessions compilation (1990) 

A compilation of both EPs, Peel Sessions, was released in 1990 by Strange Fruit.

The US cover does not have the famous "Tube" photo by Anton Corbijn. There is also a French release which has a different cover.

Track listing

References

External links 

 
 
 

Joy Division live albums
Joy Division
1990 live albums
1990 compilation albums
Strange Fruit Records compilation albums
Strange Fruit Records live albums
Albums produced by John Peel
Joy Division compilation albums
Albums produced by Bob Sargeant